Washington is a city on the south banks of the Missouri River, 50 miles west of St. Louis, Missouri, and the largest in Franklin County, Missouri, United States. The estimated population in July 2021 was 14,916, an increase of 7% since the 2010 census. It is the corncob pipe capital of the world, with Missouri Meerschaum located on the riverfront.

History 

Named after George Washington after it came under American control, the town was first settled during the rule of the Spanish Empire.  It was originally called St. John Meyer's Settlement and was the site of the Spanish log fort, San Juan del Misuri (1796–1803).

Family and followers of Daniel Boone settled the area across the river from Washington, Missouri starting in 1799.  In 1814 a ferry boat was licensed for crossing the Missouri River to the north and the settlement became known as Washington Landing.  In 1827 a town was laid out, with sale of lots starting in 1829.  The cost of land was waived if the buyer could build a substantial house within two years.  This encouraged many new settlers.

Substantial numbers of anti-slavery German families started moving to the town in 1833, and they soon overwhelmed the existing population of slaveowners. However, many of the original slaveowner's homes still remain throughout the town. Washington became a strong supporter of the Union during the American Civil War.  The town was ransacked by Confederate General Sterling Price's soldiers, but they were unable to keep control of the area.

After the war, Washington became a railroad and steamboat transportation center.  Its manufacturing industry while strong, is not as vibrant as it was decades ago.
The town of Washington has 445 buildings on the National Register of Historic Places.  Due to its historic charm, Washington has a growing heritage tourism industry, with visitors also attracted to the nearby Missouri Rhineland.

The Washington Bridge was constructed in 1934 and was the only bridge spanning the Missouri River in Franklin County. It was replaced with a new, wider bridge which was opened to traffic on December 3, 2018. The original bridge was demolished on April 13, 2019.

In 1988, the first Walmart Supercenter opened in Washington.

Geography
Washington is located at  (38.551879, -91.013313). The city has a borderline humid subtropical climate. The majority of annual precipitation falls during the humid springs and summers. Typically, fall and winter are relatively dry. While snow is not rare, it is not as frequent as in the upper Midwest. An average of 19 inches falls annually.

Climate

Demographics

2010 census
As of the census of 2010, there were 13,982 people, 5,863 households, and 3,665 families living in the city. The racial makeup of the city was 96.7% White, 0.7% African American, 0.1% Native American, 0.5% Asian, 0.1% Pacific Islander, 0.7% from other races, and 1.2% from two or more races. Hispanic or Latino of any race were 2.1% of the population.

There were 5,863 households, of which 31.3% had children under the age of 18 living with them, 48.3% were married couples living together, 10.1% had a female householder with no husband present, 4.0% had a male householder with no wife present, and 37.5% were non-families. 31.9% of all households were made up of individuals, and 14% had someone living alone who was 65 years of age or older. The average household size was 2.35 and the average family size was 2.97.

The median age in the city was 39.4 years. 24.1% of residents were under the age of 18; 8.1% were between the ages of 18 and 24; 24.8% were from 25 to 44; 26.1% were from 45 to 64; and 17% were 65 years of age or older. The gender makeup of the city was 47.8% male and 52.2% female.

2000 census
As of the census of 2000, there were 13,243 people, 5,258 households, and 3,501 families living in the city. The racial makeup of the city was 97.76% White, 0.85% African American, 0.13% Native American, 0.42% Asian, 0.23% from other races, and 0.63% from two or more races. Hispanic or Latino of any race were 0.66% of the population.

There were 5,258 households, out of which 32.7% had children under the age of 18 living with them, 53.7% were married couples living together, 9.1% had a female householder with no husband present, and 33.4% were non-families. 28.4% of all households were made up of individuals, and 12.2% had someone living alone who was 65 years of age or older.

In the city, the population was spread out, with 25.7% under the age of 18, 8.7% from 18 to 24, 30.3% from 25 to 44, 19.4% from 45 to 64, and 16.0% who were 65 years of age or older. The median age was 36 years. For every 100 females, there were 91.5 males. For every 100 females age 18 and over, there were 88.7 males.

The median income for a household in the city was $43,417, and the median income for a family was $52,433. Males had a median income of $36,163 versus $23,666 for females. The per capita income for the city was $22,360. About 3.0% of families and 5.0% of the population were below the poverty line, including 4.1% of those under age 18 and 4.7% of those age 65 or over.

Education

School District of Washington operates public schools. Washington High School is the local high school.

Private schools:
 St. Francis Borgia Regional High School
 St. Francis Borgia Grade School (PK-8)
 Our Lady of Lourdes Grade School (PK-8)
 Immanuel Lutheran School (PK-8)

Washington has a public library, a branch of the Scenic Regional Library system.

Sister city
In 1990 Marbach am Neckar (Germany) became the sister city of Washington. Student exchanges and visitations between the two cities occur occasionally.

Notable people
 Matt Pickens, professional soccer player currently playing for the Tampa Bay Rowdies. Pickens played in the Major League Soccer (MLS) with the Chicago Fire and the Colorado Rapids. While captain of the Rapids, Pickens led his team to Colorado's first MLS championship. Pickens was signed by the English football club Queens Park Rangers, only to be plagued by injuries and unstable front office management.
 Jack Wagner, Emmy Award-nominated American actor. Roles on General Hospital and The Bold and the Beautiful. He also played a swinging doctor on Melrose Place.

References

External links

 City of Washington 
 Washington Chamber of Commerce
 Historic maps of Washington in the Sanborn Maps of Missouri Collection at the University of Missouri

Cities in Franklin County, Missouri
Missouri populated places on the Missouri River
Cities in Missouri